Jabulqa and Jabulsa or Jabalq and Jabars,  are two legendary cities mentioned in Islam. They are said to be made of emerald and visited by the Prophet in his Night Journey.  

In a conversation between the Prophet Muhammad and his cousin Ali ibn Abi Talib, a description of the cities are given. They are said to be situated in darkness and contiguous to the primeval Mount Qaf. Jabulqa is located in the eastern-most corner of the world and Jabulsa on the western-most one. The figure Dhu al-Qarnayn, mentioned in the Quran, is said to have tried to visit the cities but gave up halfway. However, he was successful in seeing the rising and setting spots of the Sun. Each city is 12,000 parasangs (at least 36,000 miles) long and wide, with 12,000 gates, and each are guarded by 12,000 men until the Day of Resurrection, when the Qa'im will appear.In the early Basa'ir al-darajat, these cities were inhabited by archetypal male believers who are neither human, jinn nor angels (but their service to God is similar to those of angels). They appear to be part tellurian and part angelic yet enjoy mystical communion with all the Imāms while awaiting the appearance of the Qa'im. The cities are guarded by 1,000 men each night for a year for each of the 12 fortresses. This is due to the enemy people, called Tharis and Taqil, who behave like the Yajuj & Majuj. The Prophet visited the cities in his Night Journey.

Later Shi'i scholars, including Muhammad Taqi al-Majlisi (d. 1659) and Muhammad Baqir al-Bahai al-Hamadani (d. 1915), have used these two cities to support the story of the Green Island, the place where the last Imam is hiding. The cities also appear in the works of Shahab al-Din Suhrawardi and Shaykh Ahmad. Bahá'u'lláh, founder of the Bahá'í Faith, in his Javáhiru’l-Asrár (Gems of Divine Mysteries) and other works, interprets Jabulqa and Jabulsa symbolically.

Notes

References

Islamic eschatology
Mythological populated places